This page lists the known war correspondents, war photographers, war artists, and war cinematographers who were active during the First and Second Balkan Wars.

The First Balkan War lasted from October 1912 to May 1913, and comprised actions of the Balkan League (Serbia, Greece, Montenegro and Bulgaria) against the Ottoman Empire. Montenegro declared war on 8 October and Bulgaria, Serbia and Greece followed suit on 17 October. The war concluded with signing of the Treaty of London on 30 May 1913. The Second Balkan War broke out when Bulgaria, dissatisfied with its share of the spoils of the First Balkan War, attacked its former allies, Serbia and Greece, on 29 June 1913. The war ended with the signing of the Treaty of Bucharest by the three powers on 10 August 1913.

An estimated 200–300 journalists from around the world covered the war in the Balkans in November 1912.

Reporting on the war from Greece 

The official censorship bureau was established at the Ministry of Foreign Affairs in Athens. Each journalist had to make an application to proceed to the front, and enclose a photograph, together with a certificate from their country's Ministry in Athens. The Greek Government then issued the journalist an identity card which identified the paper he or she represented, their photograph, and a copy of their signature.  The journalist was given a spade-shaped blue-and-white badge the size of a small plate to pin on their chest, on which the letters "ΕΦ" were worked, being the initial letters of the Greek word for "Newspaper" (Εφημερίδα).

The day after the Battle of Sarantaporo, journalists were allowed to proceed to the Epirus front.

Reporting on the war from Bulgaria 

Following the outbreak of hostilities in 1912, almost 150 foreign correspondents rushed to Bulgaria, which was soon identified as the center of all major military developments. The Bulgarian government was successful in identifying and controlling the journalists. The authorities required each journalist to carry a red identification card that included his or her photograph and signature, to wear a red brassard that had the letters "BK" meaning военен кореспондент and a number, and to carry a document informing the various persons who the journalist was and what the Army Headquarters would allow them to do.

Reporting on the war from Serbia 

Forty-five journalists from all around the world assembled in Belgrade to cover the First Balkan War. Foreign journalists, unless cleared by the General Staff, were not permitted in forward positions for the duration of hostilities.

Motion pictures and the Balkan Wars 

The First Balkan War provided the most extensive testing ground before the First World War for the new technology of large-scale filming, with more than 20 camera operators travelling to the region. One of the first movies was created by Robert Isidor Schwobthaler, and Albert Herr.

The Journalists

Photo gallery

References

Greece-related lists
 
Bulgaria history-related lists
Ottoman Empire-related lists
Serbia-related lists